Abbas Rajabifard (born August 23, 1966) is a Professor and the Director of Smart and Sustainable Development and Discipline Leader of Geomatics Department of Infrastructure Engineering in the Faculty of Engineering and IT at the University of Melbourne, Australia. He is also the Director of the Center for Spatial Data Infrastructures and Land Administration (CSDILA).

Career History 2012-present
Prof Rajabifard is currently the Discipline Leader of Geomatics, Department of Infrastructure Engineering, and Center Director at CSDILA, at the University of Melbourne. He is also the Director of Smart and Sustainable Development, and the Leader of the Infrastructure Platform, Faculty of Engineering and IT at this university. He was the Head of the Infrastructure Engineering Department (2012-2020). He is also the Director of the recently established Centre for Disaster Management and Public Safety (CDMPS) at the University of Melbourne. The CDMPS is focused on conducting multi-disciplinary research and training on disaster management and public safety both nationally and internationally.
He is an Advisory Board Member for the Academic Network of the United Nations Global Geospatial Information Management (UN-GGIM), and he was also the Chair of UN-GGIM for Academic Network (2016-2020).

References

External links
 Center for Spatial Data Infrastructures & Land Administration Csdila.unimelb.edu.au
 Rajabifard Official Webs Page on University of Melbourne Findanexpert.unimelb.edu.au

1966 births
Living people
Academic staff of the University of Melbourne